The 1938–39 Yugoslav Football Championship (Serbo-Croato-Slovenian: Državno prvenstvo 1938/39 / Државно првенство 1938/39) was the 16th season of Kingdom of Yugoslavia's premier football competition.

League

Results

Winning squad
Champions:

BSK Belgrade (coach: Antal Nemes)
Anton Puhar
Srđan Mrkušić
Đorđe Stoiljković
Ernest Dubac
Petar Manola
Bruno Knežević
Prvoslav Dragićević
Gustav Lechner
Svetislav Glišović
Đorđe Vujadinović
Svetislav Valjarević
Milorad Nikolić
Vojin Božović
Dobrivoje Zečević
Jan Podhradski

Top scorers
Final goalscoring position, number of goals, player/players and club.
1 - 22 goals - August Lešnik (Građanski Zagreb)
2 - 20 goals - Frane Matošić (Hajduk Split)
3 - 15 goals - Aleksandar Petrović (Jugoslavija)

See also
Yugoslav Cup
Yugoslav League Championship
Football Association of Yugoslavia

References

External links
Yugoslavia Domestic Football Full Tables

Yugoslav Football Championship
Yugo
1938–39 in Yugoslav football